Tommot is a town in Aldansky District of the Sakha Republic, Russia, located on the Aldan River (a right-hand tributary of the Lena)  southwest of Yakutsk, the capital of the republic, and  northeast of Aldan, the administrative center of the district. As of the 2010 Census, its population was 8,057.

Etymology
The name of the town is derived from a Yakut word meaning non-freezing.

Geography
Tommot is located in the Aldan Highlands.
The town was the terminus of the passenger trains of the Amur–Yakutsk Mainline. In November 2011, the railway was extended to Nizhny Bestyakh; it will eventually reach Yakutsk. Both the railway and the Lena Highway cross the Aldan at this point.

History
It was founded in 1923 with the construction of a river port on the Aldan for supplies to the Nezametny gold mine in the present-day town of Aldan. It was formerly the head of navigation of the Aldan River. Tommot was granted town status in 1925.

Administrative and municipal status
As an inhabited locality, Tommot is classified as a town under district jurisdiction. Within the framework of administrative divisions, it is, together with three rural localities, incorporated within Aldansky District as the Town of Tommot. As a municipal division, the territories of the Town of Tommot and the Settlement of Bezymyanny are incorporated within Aldansky Municipal District as Tommot Urban Settlement.

Economy
Mining of mica deposits began in 1942, after they were discovered in a stream near the town by a hunter.

References

Notes

Sources
Official website of the Sakha Republic. Registry of the Administrative-Territorial Divisions of the Sakha Republic. Aldansky District. 

Cities and towns in the Sakha Republic
Cities and towns built in the Soviet Union
Populated places established in 1923